Clarence Phillips may refer to:

 Red Phillips (baseball) (Clarence Lemuel Phillips, 1908–1988), American baseball pitcher
 Clarence W. Phillips (1925–2012), American lawyer and politician
 Bud Phillips (Clarence Edward Phillips, born 1950), American politician
 Clarence Coles Phillips (1880–1927), American artist and illustrator